An inkstand is a stand or tray used to house writing instruments, with a tightly-capped inkwell and a sand shaker for rapid drying. A penwiper would often be included, and from the mid-nineteenth century, a compartment for steel nibs, which replaced quill pens. Inkstands with tightly closing lids, often finely made, were part and parcel of a traveling kit, until the widespread use of the fountain pen. Inkstands were going out of use before the development of ballpoint pen, which finished them as a primary source of ink.

The Syng inkstand, made in 1752 by Philip Syng, was used by the American delegates to sign both the Declaration of Independence in 1776 and the United States Constitution in 1787.

Gallery

See also 
 Pounce (calligraphy)

External links 
 

Writing implements

pl:Kałamarz